Arthur Alexander (1909–1989) was an American independent film producer. He worked with his brother Max and produced.films through.various studios including their own Beacon Productions,  Colony Pictures, and Max Alexander Productions.

Biography

Alexander was born in Germany.  He began his Hollywood career in 1934 and produced about 50 films through 1949, many westerns, all with low budgets and with no connection to the established Hollywood studios (other than the fact that his uncle was Carl Laemmle, long-time head of Universal Pictures).

With his brother Max, Alexander founded Beacon Productions, Colony Pictures, and Max Alexander Productions.  He was active as producer at the short-lived Grand National Pictures from 1936 through 1939, and released through Producers Releasing Corporation afterward.  Much of his work is in public domain today and accessible online.

Partial filmography 

 Thunder Over Texas (1934)
 Cowboy Holiday (1934)
 Gun Play (1935)
 Big Boy Rides Again (1935)
 The Law of 45's (1935)
 Law and Lead (1936)
 Idaho Kid (1936)
Men of the Plains (1936)
 The Shadow Strikes (1937)
 International Crime (1938)
 Here's Flash Casey (1938)
 Songs and Saddles (1938)
 Death Rides the Range (1939)
 Phantom Rancher (1940)
 Hard Guy (1941)
 I'll Sell My Life (1941)
 Today I Hang (1942)
Bombs Over Burma (1942)
 The Dawn Express (1942)
 The Ghost and the Guest (1943)
 The Underdog (1943)
 Spook Town (1944)
 Gangsters of the Frontier (1944)
 Brand of the Devil (1944)
 Seven Doors to Death (1944)
 Waterfront (1944)
 Guns of the Law (1944)

Colony Pictures
Stormy Trails (1936)
West of Nevada (1936)
Men of the Plains (1936)
Death Rides the Range (1939) 
Flaming Lead (1939)
Lightning Strikes West (1940)
Phantom Rancher (1940)

Beacon Productions
Cowboy Holiday (1934)
Thunder Over Texas (1934)
Ticket to a Crime (1934)
I Can't Escape (1934)
The Fire Trap (1935)
What Price Crime (1935)

References

External links 
 

1909 births
1989 deaths
American film producers
20th-century American businesspeople
German emigrants to the United States